A typo (short for Typographical Error) is a mistake made in the typing process.

Typo may also refer to: typographic error

 Typo (brand), a stationery brand owned by Cotton On Group
 Typo, Kentucky, a community in the US
 Mount Typo, in Victoria, Australia

See also
 TYPO3, web-based content management system
 Type O, a blood type
 Type 0 (disambiguation)